Mayor Buenaventura Vivas Airport , is an airport serving Santo Domingo in the Táchira state of Venezuela.

The runway is just southwest of the town. The Santo Domingo VORTAC (Ident: STD) is located in the town.

Airlines and destinations

See also
Transport in Venezuela
List of airports in Venezuela

References

External links
SkyVector - Santo Domingo
OurAirports - Mayor Buenaventura Vivas
OpenStreetMap - Santo Domingo

Airports in Venezuela
Buildings and structures in Táchira